Úlehle is a municipality and village in Strakonice District in the South Bohemian Region of the Czech Republic. It has about 100 inhabitants.

Administrative parts
Villages of Radkovice and Švejcarova Lhota are administrative parts of Úlehle.

References

Villages in Strakonice District